Mania is a severe mental condition.

Mania may also refer to:

Mythology
Mania (deity), goddesses in Greek, Roman and Etruscan mythology
Mania, one of the Maniae spirits in Greek mythology

Places
Mania, Dildarnagar, a village in Uttar Pradesh state of India
Mania, the ancient name of Cape Agrilia, a cape on the island of Lesbos, Greece
Mania River, Madagascar
Mania Tower, a high-rise building in Pleven, Bulgaria

People with the name
Mania (name), a list of people with either the given name or surname

Arts, entertainment, and media

Films
Mania (1918 film), a 1918 German silent film
Mania, the U.S. title of the 1960 horror film The Flesh and the Fiends
Mania (1974 film), a 1974 Italian film
Mania (1985 film), a 1985 Greek film
Mania (2015 film), a 2015 American film

Music
Mania (band), a British pop duo
Mania (EP), a 2013 EP by New Found Glory
Mania (Fall Out Boy album), 2018
Mania (Menudo album), 1984
Mania (The Lucy Show album), 1986
Ramones Mania, the first compilation album by the Ramones, released in 1988

Other uses in arts, entertainment, and media
Mania (comics), a Marvel Comics character introduced in 2013
Sonic Mania, a video game
StepMania and osu!mania, rhythm games similar to Dance Dance Revolution

Sports
Maryland Mania, an American soccer club that played in the USL A-league in 1999
WrestleMania, an annual WWE professional wrestling event commonly referred to as "Mania" by fans

Psychology
Mania (love), from the Latin for "mental disorder", from which we get the term "manic"

Biology
Mania (genus), a genus of moths

See also
Manic (disambiguation)